"Til I Find My Love" is a single by Canadian country music group Family Brown. Released in May 1988, the song is the first single from their tenth studio album These Days. The song reached number one on the RPM Country Tracks chart in July 1988 and also crossed over to the Adult Contemporary Tracks chart, peaking at number 19.

Chart performance

Year-end charts

References

1988 singles
Family Brown songs
RCA Records singles
Songs written by Barry Brown (Canadian musician)
1988 songs